El Caño is a town and corregimiento in Natá District, Coclé Province, Panama. Its population as of 1990 was 2,936; its population as of 2000 was 3,276.

El Caño is named after a nearby waterfall found in a creek whose waters end in a nearby river.

References

Corregimientos of Coclé Province